Edward Alexander McCourt (October 10, 1907 – January 6, 1972) was a Canadian writer.

Born in Mullingar, Ireland, McCourt's family emigrated to Kitscoty, Alberta when he was two years old. He was educated at the University of Alberta, becoming a Rhodes Scholar at Merton College, Oxford, and earned an MA from Oxford University. Returning to Canada, he worked at Upper Canada College, Queen's University and the University of New Brunswick before joining the faculty of the University of Saskatchewan in 1944.

McCourt published five novels—Music at the Close (1947), Home Is the Stranger (1950), The Wooden Sword (1956), Walk Through the Valley (1958) and Fasting Friar (1963). His non-fiction titles included The Canadian West in Fiction (1949), a critical analysis of regional literature from the Canadian Prairies, Revolt in the West (1958), about the North-West Rebellion, and Remembering Butler (1967), a biography of Sir William Butler, as well as works of travel writing.

Music at the Close won the Ryerson Fiction Award in 1947, and was republished by the New Canadian Library in 1972.

McCourt died on January 6, 1972.

References 

 Theme and form in the novels of Edward A. McCourt, by Neil Graham, Thesis M. A., University of Windsor, 1968 (with a bibliography)

1907 births
1972 deaths
20th-century Canadian novelists
Canadian male novelists
Canadian literary critics
Canadian biographers
Male biographers
Canadian travel writers
Canadian Rhodes Scholars
Irish emigrants to Canada (before 1923)
Academic staff of the University of Saskatchewan
Writers from Saskatchewan
Writers from Alberta
People from Mullingar
20th-century biographers
20th-century Canadian male writers
Canadian male non-fiction writers
Alumni of Merton College, Oxford